Erika Netzer (23 June 1937 – 30 November 1977) was an Austrian alpine skier. She had a surprise victory in 1959 that garnered her attention. She went on to compete for Austria at the 1960 Winter Olympics.

References 

Austrian female alpine skiers
Alpine skiers at the 1960 Winter Olympics
1937 births
1977 deaths
Olympic alpine skiers of Austria
Sportspeople from Vorarlberg
20th-century Austrian women